This article contains information about the literary events and publications of 1988.

Events
March 7 – Nine thousand movie and television writers of the Writers' Guild of America go on strike a day after rejecting a final offer from producers.
May 28–31 – The first Hay Festival of literature is held in the Welsh Marches.
June – The Panasonic Globe Theatre, Tokyo, opens with an Ingmar Bergman production of Shakespeare's Hamlet.
August 7 – The Writers Guild of America strike formally ends.
November 15 – Copyright, Designs and Patents Act 1988 reforms copyright law in the United Kingdom, with special provision for Great Ormond Street Hospital for sick children to benefit in perpetuity from royalties in J. M. Barrie's 1904 play Peter Pan, or The Boy Who Wouldn't Grow Up.
unknown date – Vasily Grossman's 1960 novel Life and Fate (Жизнь и судьба) is published for the first time in the Soviet Union, in the magazine Oktyabr.

New books

Fiction
Caio Fernando Abreu – Os dragões não conhecem o paraíso (Dragons, short stories)
Margaret Atwood – Cat's Eye
Bernardo Atxaga – Obabakoak (short stories)
J. G. Ballard
Memories of the Space Age
Running Wild
Iain M. Banks – The Player of Games
Clive Barker
Cabal
The Hellbound Heart
Thomas Berger – The Houseguest
Michael Blake – Dances with Wolves
Dionne Brand – Sans Souci and Other Stories
Ray Bradbury – The Toynbee Convector (short story)
Orson Scott Card – Treason
Peter Carey – Oscar and Lucinda
Roger Caron – Jojo
Michael Chabon – The Mysteries of Pittsburgh
Tom Clancy – The Cardinal of the Kremlin
Paulo Coelho – The Alchemist
Hugh Cook – The Walrus and the Warwolf
Bernard Cornwell
Sharpe's Rifles
Wildtrack
Jim Crace – The Gift of Stones
Tsitsi Dangarembga – Nervous Conditions
Robertson Davies – The Lyre of Orpheus
L. Sprague de Camp and Catherine Crook de Camp – The Stones of Nomuru
Don DeLillo – Libra
Dương Thu Hương – Paradise of the Blind (Những thiên đường mù)
Allan W. Eckert – The Dark Green Tunnel
Umberto Eco – Foucault's Pendulum (Il pendolo di Foucault)
John Gardner – Scorpius
Thomas Harris – The Silence of the Lambs
Joseph Heller – Picture This
Alan Hollinghurst – The Swimming Pool Library
William Horwood – Duncton Wood
Hamid Ismailov – Собрание Утончённых
Judith Krantz – 'Til We Meet Again
Doris Lessing – The Fifth Child
Bernard-Henri Lévy – Les Derniers Jours de Charles Baudelaire
Robert Ludlum – The Icarus Agenda
Javier Marías – Todas las almas (All Souls)
David Markson – Wittgenstein's Mistress
James A. Michener – Alaska
Robert B. Parker – Crimson Joy
Belva Plain – Tapestry
Ellis Peters
The Confession of Brother Haluin
A Rare Benedictine: The Advent of Brother Cadfael
Richard Powers – Prisoner's Dilemma
Tim Powers – On Stranger Tides
Terry Pratchett
Sourcery
Wyrd Sisters
Christoph Ransmayr – The Last World
Jean Raspail – Blue Island
Alina Reyes – The Butcher
David Adams Richards – Nights Below Station Street
Salman Rushdie – The Satanic Verses
Richard Russo – The Risk Pool
R. A. Salvatore – The Crystal Shard (first of The Icewind Dale Trilogy)
Sidney Sheldon – The Sands of Time
Clark Ashton Smith – A Rendezvous in Averoigne
Danielle Steel – Zoya
Thomas Sullivan – The Phases of Harry Moon
Julian Symons – The Kentish Manor Murders
Nikolai Tolstoy – The Coming of the King
Anne Tyler – Breathing Lessons
Andrew Vachss – Blue Belle
Mario Vargas Llosa – In Praise of the Stepmother (Elogio de la madrastra)
Banana Yoshimoto – Kitchen

Children and young people
Chris Van Allsburg – Two Bad Ants
Martin Auer – Now, Now, Markus (Bimbo und sein Vogel)
Lyll Becerra de Jenkins - The Honorable Prison
Roald Dahl – Matilda
Janice Elliott – The Empty Throne (second in The Sword and the Dream series)
Virginia Hamilton (with Barry Moser) – In the Beginning: Creation Stories from Around the World
William Joyce – Robots
Elizabeth Laird – Red Sky in the Morning (also as Loving Ben)
Geraldine McCaughrean – A Pack of Lies
Patricia McKissack – Mirandy and Brother Wind
Beatrice Schenk de Regniers (with Eva Moore et al.) – Sing a Song of Popcorn: Every Child's Book of Poems
Christopher Tolkien (with J. R. R. Tolkien and Alan Lee) – The Return of the Shadow
P. L. Travers – Mary Poppins and the House Next Door
Manuel Vázquez Montalbán (with Willi Glasauer) – Escenas de la Literatura Universal y Retratos de Grandes Autores (Scenes from World Literature and Portraits of Greatest Authors)

Drama
Alan Bennett – Single Spies (stage versions of An Englishman Abroad and A Question of Attribution)
Thomas Bernhard – Heldenplatz
David Henry Hwang – M. Butterfly
Ann-Marie MacDonald – Goodnight Desdemona (Good Morning Juliet)
Peter Shaffer – Lettice and Lovage
Tom Stoppard – Hapgood
Botho Strauß – Seven Doors (Sieben Türen)

Poetry
Giannina Braschi – El imperio de los sueños (Empire of Dreams)
James Merrill – The Inner Room
Grazyna Miller – "Curriculum"

Non-fiction
David Herbert Donald – Look Homeward: A Life of Thomas Wolfe
Albert Goldman – The Lives of John Lennon
Sita Ram Goel – Catholic Ashrams
Stephen Hawking – A Brief History of Time
K. S. Lal – The Mughal Harem 
Patrick Macnee and Marie Cameron – Blind in One Ear: The Avenger Returns (Macnee's autobiography)
Michel Maffesoli – The Time of the Tribes (Le Temps des tribus)
Lou Mollgaard – Kiki: Reine de la Montparnasse
Rosalind Miles – The Women's History of the World
Alanna Nash – Golden Girl: The Story of Jessica Savitch
Lady Violet Powell – The Life of a Provincial Lady: A Study of E. M. Delafield and Her Works
Philip Roth – The Facts: A Novelist's Autobiography
Miranda Seymour – A Ring of Conspirators: Henry James and his Literary Circle, 1895–1915
Joe Simpson – Touching the Void
William L. Sullivan – Listening for Coyote
Frédéric Vitoux – Céline: A Biography (La Vie de Céline)

Births
January 28 - Pierce Brown, American science-fiction writer
May 18 – Luu Quang Minh, Vietnamese writer and singer
August 19 - Veronica Roth, American young-adult novelist and short story writer
October 14 – Ocean Vuong, Vietnamese-American poet
November 9 - Tahereh Mafi, American young-adult novelist
unknown date – Fiona Mozley, English novelist and medievalist

Deaths
February 3 – Robert Duncan, American poet (born 1919)
February 6 – Marghanita Laski, English biographer, novelist and broadcaster (born 1915)
February 27 – Basil Boothroyd, English poet and humorist (born 1910)
February 28 – Kylie Tennant, Australian novelist, playwright and historian (born 1912)
March 19 – Máirtín Ó Direáin, Irish-language poet (born 1910)
April 12 – Alan Paton, South African novelist and political activist (born 1903)
April 15 – Modest Morariu, Romanian poet, essayist, prose writer and translator (born 1929)
April 21 – I. A. L. Diamond, Bessarabian-born American comedy writer (born 1920)
May 3 – Premendra Mitra, Bengali poet, novelist and short story writer (born 1904)
May 8 – Robert A. Heinlein, American science fiction writer (born 1907)
May 10 – Shen Congwen, Chinese writer (born 1902)
May 23 – Aya Kitō, Japanese diarist (born 1962)
June 6 – Gheorghe Eminescu, Romanian historian and memoirist (lung disease, born 1890)
June 10 – Louis L'Amour, American western novelist (born 1908)
June 21 – George Ivașcu, Romanian journalist, literary critic, and communist militant (born 1911)
July 10 – Enrique Lihn, Chilean poet, playwright, and novelist (cancer, born 1929)
July 12 – Joshua Logan, American stage and film writer (born 1908)
August 2 – Raymond Carver, American short-story writer and poet (born 1938)
August 20 – Joan G. Robinson, English children's writer and illustrator (born 1910)
August 23 – Menotti Del Picchia, Brazilian poet, journalist and painter (born 1892)
August 28 – Max Shulman, American novelist, short-story writer and dramatist (born 1919)
September 28 – Charles Addams, American cartoonist (born 1912)
October 1 – Sacheverell Sitwell, English art critic (born 1897)
October 10 – Bhabani Bhattacharya, Indian fiction writer (born 1906)
October 12 – Ruth Manning-Sanders, British children's author (born 1895)
October 16 – Christian Matras, Faroese poet (born 1900)
November 2 – Stewart Parker, Northern Irish poet and playwright (cancer, born 1941)
November 8 – Hamad al-Hajji, Saudi Arabian poet (born 1939)
December 16 – Frank Bonham, American western and young adult novelist (born 1914)

Awards
Nobel Prize for Literature: Naguib Mahfouz

Australia
The Australian/Vogel Literary Award: Tom Flood, Oceana Fine
C. J. Dennis Prize for Poetry: Judith Beveridge, The Domesticity of Giraffes
Kenneth Slessor Prize for Poetry: Judith Beveridge, The Domesticity of Giraffes
Mary Gilmore Prize: Judith Beveridge, The Domesticity of Giraffes
Miles Franklin Award: No award presented

Canada
See 1988 Governor General's Awards for a complete list of winners and finalists for those awards.

France
Grand Prix de Littérature Policière International: Andrew Vachss, Strega
Prix Goncourt: Érik Orsenna, L'Exposition coloniale
Prix Médicis French: Christiane Rochefort, La Porte du fond
Prix Médicis International: Thomas Bernhard, les Maîtres anciens

United Kingdom
Booker Prize: Peter Carey, Oscar and Lucinda
Carnegie Medal for children's literature: Geraldine McCaughrean, A Pack of Lies
Cholmondeley Award: John Heath-Stubbs, Sean O'Brien, John Whitworth
Eric Gregory Award: Michael Symmons Roberts, Gwyneth Lewis, Adrian Blackledge, Simon Armitage, Robert Crawford
James Tait Black Memorial Prize for fiction: Piers Paul Read, A Season in the West
James Tait Black Memorial Prize for biography: Brian McGuinness, Wittgenstein, A Life: Young Ludwig (1889–1921)
Queen's Gold Medal for Poetry: Derek Walcott
Whitbread Best Book Award: Paul Sayer, The Comforts of Madness
The Sunday Express Book of the Year: David Lodge, Nice Work

United States
Agnes Lynch Starrett Poetry Prize: Maxine Scates, Toluca Street
Aiken Taylor Award for Modern American Poetry: Richard Wilbur
Frost Medal: Carolyn Kizer
National Book Award for Fiction: Pete Dexter, Paris Trout
National Book Critics Circle: Bharati Mukherjee, The Middleman and Other Stories
Nebula Award: Lois McMaster Bujold, Falling Free
Newbery Medal for children's literature: Russell Freedman, Lincoln: A Photobiography
PEN/Faulkner Award for Fiction: T. Coraghessan Boyle, World's End
Pulitzer Prize for Drama: Alfred Uhry, Driving Miss Daisy
Pulitzer Prize for Fiction: Toni Morrison, Beloved
Pulitzer Prize for Poetry: William Meredith: Partial Accounts: New and Selected Poems
Whiting Awards: Fiction: Lydia Davis, Bruce Duffy, Jonathan Franzen, Mary La Chapelle, William T. Vollmann. Nonfiction: Gerald Early, Geoffrey O'Brien. Poetry: Michael Burkard, Li-Young Lee, Sylvia Moss

Spain
Premio Nadal: , Retratos de ambigú

References

 
Years of the 20th century in literature